Vlastimil Veselý (born 6 May 1993 in Brno) is a Czech football player who currently plays for FC Vysočina Jihlava in Czech National Football League.

References
 Profile at FC Zbrojovka Brno official site
 Profile at 1. SC Znojmo official site
 Vlastimil Veselý at Soccerway

1993 births
Living people
Czech footballers
Czech Republic under-21 international footballers
Czech First League players
FC Zbrojovka Brno players
FC Vysočina Jihlava players
Footballers from Brno
Association football goalkeepers
SK Líšeň players
1. SC Znojmo players
Czech National Football League players